Judith E. Tucker is a professor of history at Georgetown University. She was the editor-in-chief of the International Journal of Middle East Studies from 2004 until 2009. She is a past president of the Middle East Studies Association of North America

Education and career
Tucker grew up in Connecticut and was first introduced to Middle East studies through reading 1001 Nights. She has a B.A. from Radcliffe College and an M.A. from Harvard University. She earned her Ph.D. from Harvard University in 1981, and started at Georgetown University in 1983 as an assistant professor. From 2004 to 2009 Tucker was the editor-in-chief of the International Journal of Middle East Studies. Tucker was president of the Middle East Studies Association from 2017 until 2020.

Selected publications

reviewed in Islamic Law and Society

Honors and awards 
Tucker was named a distinguished lecturer in 2012 by the Journal of Middle East Women's Studies.

Personal life
Tucker and her husband, Sharif Elmusa, met in graduate school and they have two children.

References 

Harvard University alumni
Radcliffe College alumni
Georgetown University faculty
Living people
Middle Eastern studies scholars
Year of birth missing (living people)